Salem Township is the name of some places in the U.S. state of Pennsylvania:

Salem Township, Clarion County, Pennsylvania
Salem Township, Luzerne County, Pennsylvania
Salem Township, Mercer County, Pennsylvania
Salem Township, Wayne County, Pennsylvania
Salem Township, Westmoreland County, Pennsylvania

Pennsylvania township disambiguation pages